Gagliato is a village and comune in the province of Catanzaro, in the Calabria region of southern Italy. In recognition of the unique role that the town has come to play as an international magnet for global leaders in nanotechnology, and as host of the NanoGagliato events, Gagliato has received the official appellation of “Paese delle NanoScienze”, town of Nanosciences, attributed by the City Council.

Notes and references

Cities and towns in Calabria